Elecon Engineering Company Limited is an Indian multinational company headquartered in Anand, Gujarat. The company specializes in the manufacturing of industrial gear and material handling equipment. Elecon is one of the largest Asian manufacturers of industrial gears and material handling equipment  for core major sector like power, steel, cement, sugar, paper, mining, rubber and many more. Elecon group has subsidiaries such as Eimco Elecon Ltd, Elecon Hydraulics, Elecon Information Technology Ltd (EITL) and Tech Elecon Pvt. Ltd. (TEPL).

History
Elecon Engineering was established in 1951 in Goregaon, Mumbai by Ishwarbhai B. Patel. The company's early focus was on engineering, procurement and construction projects in India and initially manufactured custom manufacturing conveyor systems. The company was then registered as a Private Limited company on 11 January 1960.

In May 1960, the company moved to its current location in Vallabh Vidyanagar, Gujarat (now part of Anand). Later, the company was listed on the Bombay Stock Exchange and the National Stock Exchange.

In 1976, the company established its Gear Division, specialising in power transmission equipment and industrial gears. It designs and manufactures worm drives, helical gears, planetary gears, couplings, loose gears, Custom built gearboxs  and spiral bevel gears. Its products target a range of industries, including steel rolling mills, wind turbines, marine applications and space applications.

In 1995, Elecon established its Alternate Energy Division, for the design and manufacture of wind turbines.

In 2012, Elecon Engineering secured two prestigious orders from the NTPC and Tecpro Systems.

Acquisitions and subsidiaries

Acquisitions 
In October 2010, Elecon acquired the Benzlers-Radicon Group, the power transmission division of UK-based David Brown Ltd.

Subsidiaries 

Radicon Transmission UK Limited
 Elecon Singapore pte.Limited
 Elecon Middle East FZE
 Benzler System AB -Sweden 
 AB Banzlers -Sweden 
 Radicon Drive System Inc. - US
 Banzlers Transmission A.S. - Denmark 
 Benzlers Antriebstechnik G.m.b.h.
 Banzlers TBA B.V. -Netherlands
 OY banzlers AB-Finland 
The Group of Companies
 Emtici Engineering
 Power Build Private Limited
 Vijay M. Mistry Construction Pvt. Ltd
 Modsonic Instruments Mfg. Co. (P) Ltd.
Associates
 Eimco Elecon (India) Ltd.

References

Companies based in Gujarat
Engineering companies of India
Anand district
Indian companies established in 1951
1951 establishments in Bombay State
Companies listed on the National Stock Exchange of India
Companies listed on the Bombay Stock Exchange